Turgut Uçar (10 March 1964 İzmir– 4 February 2019 İzmir) was a Turkish football manager and coach. He was a footballer as midfielder.

He began football career at Altay S.K. and became professional in 1982–83 season. He transferred to Trabzonspor in 1988–89 season and played for 5 years. He also played for Gaziantepspor (1993–1994), Karşıyaka (1994–1996), Balıkesirspor (1996–1998) and Soma Linyitspor (1998–99). He retired in 1999.

He managed Altay S.K. (2001, 2004–2005 and 2012–13), Adanaspor (2001–2002), Akhisarspor  (2003-2004), Uşakspor (2005–2006) and Yimpaş Yozgatspor 2006, Karşıyaka (2006–2007, 2011 and 2016–17), Karabükspor (2008), İskenderun DÇ (2010), Tokatspor (2010) and Bandırmaspor (2012–13). He died from cerebral embolism on 4 February 2019 in İzmir after hospitalized nearly 3 months

References

Turkish football managers
1964 births
2019 deaths
Altay S.K. footballers
Trabzonspor footballers
Gaziantepspor footballers
Karşıyaka S.K. footballers
Association football defenders
Turkish footballers
Balıkesirspor footballers
Altay S.K. managers
Karşıyaka S.K. managers
Kardemir Karabükspor managers
Akhisarspor managers